Ampullinidae are a mostly extinct taxonomic family of deep-water sea snails, marine gastropod molluscs in the clade Caenogastropoda.

The shells of species in this family resemble those of naticids. Sea snails of this family lived from the Triassic period to the Pliocene age of the Cenozoic.

But when the extant species Cernina fluctuata is considered as a member of this family, then Ampullinidae is extant.

Taxonomy
No subfamilies in this family are recognized in the taxonomy of Bouchet & Rocroi (2005).

The contents and synonymy of Ampullinidae have been treated by the World Register of Marine Species after Lozouet et al. (2001), Kase & Ishikawa (2003) and Bandel (2006). The position in Campaniloidea is based on anatomical data on Cernina fluctuata (Kase, 1990; Healy, pers. comm., sperm morphology), but Ampullinoidea is treated as distinct superfamily by Lozouet et al. (2001) and Bandel (2006).

Genera
Genera within the family Ampullinidae include:
 Ampullina Bowdich, 1822 - the type genus
 Amaurellina Fischer 1885
 Ampullinopsis Conrad 1865
 Ampullonatica Sacco 1890
 Cernina Gray, 1842
 Crommium Cossmann, 1888 
 Globularia Swainson 1840
 Pachycrommium Woodring 1928
 Warakia Harzhauser 2007

References

Ampullinidae in the Paleobiology Database
 M. Pacaud and J. Le Renard. 1995. Révision des Mollusques Paléogénes du Bassin de Paris. IV - Liste systématique actualisée. Cossmanniana 3(4):155-187
 P. Lozouet, J.-F. Lesport, and R. Renard. 2001. Révision des Gastropoda (Mollusca) du stratotype de L'Aquitanien (Miocéne inf.)" site de Saucats "Lariey", Gironde, France. Cossmanniana 8:1-189
 P. Bouchet, J.-P. Rocroi, J. Frýda, B. Hausdorf, W. Ponder, A. Valdes, and A. Warén. 2005. A nomenclator and classification of gastropod family-group names. Malacologia 47(1-2):1-368
 Y. Okan and I. Hosgor. 2008. The Ampullinid Gastropod Globularia (Swainson 1840) from the late Thanetian-early Ilerdian Kirkkavak formation (Polatli-Ankara) of the Tethyan realm. Turkish Journal of Earth Sciences 17:758-801
 M. Harzhauser, M. Euter, W. E. Piller, B. Berning, A. Kroh and O. Mandic. 2009. Oligocene and Early Miocene gastropods from Kutch (NW India) document an early biogeographic switch from Western Tethys to Indo-Pacific. Paläontologische Zeitschrift 83:333-372
 Kiel S. (2003) New taxonomic data for the gastropod fauna of the Umzamba Formation (Santonian–Campanian, South Africa); Cretaceous Research 24 (2003) 449–475

External links